Some Fruits of Solitude in Reflections and Maxims is a 1682 collection of epigrams and sayings put together by the early American Quaker leader William Penn. Like Benjamin Franklin's Poor Richard's Almanack the work collected the wisdom of pre-Revolutionary America. It is included in volume one of the Harvard Classics. The 1718 sequel was called More Fruits of Solitude.

References

External links
Modern History Sourcebook: William Penn (1644-1718): Some Fruits of Solitude In Reflections And Maxims, 1682, Fordham University 

1682 books
Works by William Penn